The Caçanje River, also called the Cassange River, is a river of Mato Grosso state in western Brazil. It is a tributary of the Cuiabá River.

Course

The Caçanje River defines part of the northern border of the Encontro das Águas State Park, then flows northeast to join the Cuiabá River.
Further south the Alegre River flows northeast across the park parallel to the Caçanje, forms part of the eastern border, then continues east to join the Caçanje just before that river enters the Cuiabá.
The region, rich in watercourses, supports diverse pantanal vegetation.

See also
List of rivers of Mato Grosso

References

Sources

Rivers of Mato Grosso